= Experimental hardcore =

Experimental hardcore may refer to:

- Mathcore
- Post-hardcore
- Other music combining a hardcore punk influence with аn experimental or avant-garde approach
